Nucular is a common, proscribed pronunciation of the word "nuclear". The Oxford English Dictionarys entry dates the word's first published appearance to 1943.

Dictionary notes

This is one of two contentious pronunciations which receive particular mention in the FAQ of the Merriam-Webster Dictionary:

Though disapproved of by many, pronunciations ending in \-kyə-lər\ have been found in widespread use among educated speakers, including scientists, lawyers, professors, congressmen, United States cabinet members, and at least two United States presidents and one vice president. While most common in the United States, these pronunciations have also been heard from British and Canadian speakers.

The American Heritage Dictionary notes:
The pronunciation (noo'kyə-lər), which is generally considered incorrect, is an example of how a familiar phonological pattern can influence an unfamiliar one … [since] much more common is the similar sequence (-kyə-lər), which occurs in words like particular, circular, spectacular, and in many scientific words like molecular, ocular, and vascular.

The Oxford English Dictionary notes:
The colloquial pronunciation British /ˈnjuːkjʊlə/, U.S. /ˈn(j)ukjələr/ (frequently rendered in written form as nucular[...]) has been criticized in usage guides since at least the mid 20th century [...] although it is now commonly given as a variant in modern dictionaries.

In his 1999 book The Big Book of Beastly Mispronunciations, logophile Charles Harrington Elster noted that the vast majority of those he spoke with during the writing of his book as well as 99 percent of the 1985 usage panel of Morris & Morris' Harper Dictionary of Contemporary Usage specifically condemned the use of the word and characterized it as a mispronunciation. Elster's own view on the matter derives from the root of the word: "nucleus". Arguing by analogy, Elster suggests that "Molecular comes from molecule, and particular comes from particle, but there is no nucule to support nucular."

Notable users
The U.S. presidents Dwight D. Eisenhower, Jimmy Carter, Bill Clinton, George W. Bush and vice president Walter Mondale used this pronunciation.  In his 2005 book, Going Nucular, linguist Geoffrey Nunberg suggested that the presidents' reasons for their differing pronunciations may be distinct. Whereas Eisenhower's pronunciation most likely arose from his lack of familiarity (he first learned the word in mid-life), Bush's usage may represent a calculated effort to appeal to populist sentiment, though Nunberg's theory here is rejected by fellow linguist Steven Pinker. This analysis is repeated in the second edition of Elster's Big Book of Beastly Mispronunciations.

Oxford professor Marcus du Sautoy used this pronunciation in a BBC documentary, and Orson Welles said "nucular" while speaking at the 1982 "No Nukes" rally in Central Park.

The nuclear physicist Edward Teller, "father" of the American hydrogen bomb, supposedly used nucular, and it does enjoy some tradition in the American nuclear-research establishment. However, in a 1965 interview on the ill-fated Project Plowshare, Teller used the standard pronunciation.

In popular culture 

In popular culture, this pronunciation has often been used to signify inferiority, low intellect or foolishness.

In Woody Allen's 1989 film Crimes and Misdemeanors, Mia Farrow's character says she could never fall for any man who says "nucular". The pronunciation was satirized in the 1996 science fiction film Mars Attacks!. Later, the pronunciation was utilized earnestly by the titular character in Indiana Jones and the Kingdom of the Crystal Skull after Indiana survives an atomic bomb test by crawling inside a lead-lined refrigerator.

In Madagascar 3: Europe's Most Wanted, Skipper corrects Gloria's standard pronunciation of the word "nuclear" to "nucular".

In Don Delillo's 1997 novel Underworld, Marvin mentions nuclear weapons and it is said "He pronounced it nucular".

Homer Simpson (a nuclear power plant employee) of the popular American animated TV series The Simpsons and Peter Griffin of the animated comedy series Family Guy both pronounce nuclear this way (in these episodes, Homer Simpson and Peter Griffin both "correct" someone else's correct pronunciation of the word).

In Get Smart, the President, in a clear parody of George W. Bush, says "nucular", only for the exasperated Chief of CONTROL to loudly correct him.

Motivation
Steven Pinker has proposed a phonotactic explanation for the conversion of nuclear to nucular: the unusual and disfavored sequence  is gradually transformed to a more acceptable configuration via metathesis.  However, Arnold Zwicky notes that  presents no difficulty for English speakers in words such as pricklier. He also regards the proposition of metathesis as unnecessary.  Zwicky suggests a morphological origin, combining the slang nuke with the common sequence -cular (molecular, particular, etc.). Supporting Zwicky's hypothesis, Geoffrey Nunberg quotes a government weapons specialist: "Oh, I only say 'nucular' when I'm talking about nukes." Nunberg argues that this pronunciation by weapons specialists and by politicians such as Bush may be a deliberate choice. He suggests that the reasons for this choice are to assert authority or to sound folksy.

See also
 Bushism
 Political gaffe

References

English words and phrases
Nuclear energy